Ngāpuhi (or Ngā Puhi) is a Māori iwi associated with the Northland regions of New Zealand centred in the Hokianga, the Bay of Islands, and Whangārei.

According to the 2018 New Zealand census, the estimated population of Ngāpuhi is 165,201. This compares to 125,601 in 2001, 102,981 in 2006, and 122,214  in 2013. It is formed from 150 hapū or subtribes, with 55 marae.

Despite such diversity, the people of Ngāpuhi maintain their shared history and self-identity. Te Rūnanga ā Iwi o Ngāpuhi, based in Kaikohe, administers the iwi. The Rūnanga acts on behalf of the iwi in consultations with the New Zealand government. It also ensures the equitable distribution of benefits from the 1992 fisheries settlement with the government, and undertakes resource management and education initiatives.

History

Foundations
The founding ancestor of Ngāpuhi is Rāhiri, the son of Tauramoko and Te Hauangiangi. Tauramoko was a descendant of Kupe, from Matawhaorua, and Nukutawhiti, of the Ngātokimatawhaorua canoe. Te Hauangiangi was the daughter of Puhi, who captained the Mataatua canoe northwards from the Bay of Plenty. Rāhiri was born at Whiria pā, near Opononi in the Hokianga. The early tribes led by Rāhiri's descendants lived in the Hokianga, Kaikohe, and Pouerua areas.

Through intermarriage with other iwi and expansionist land migration, the descendants of Rāhiri formed tribes across the Northland peninsula. These actions also fostered ties with neighbouring iwi. Auha and Whakaaria, for example, led expansion eastward from Kaikohe and Pouērua into the Bay of Islands area, overrunning and often intermarrying with Ngāi Tāhuhu, Ngāti Manaia, Te Wahineiti and Ngāti Miru. These tribes in the east were the first to use the name Ngāpuhi. As the eastern and western groups merged, the name came to describe all the tribes settled in the Hokianga and Bay of Islands. In the late 1700s and early 1800s, the Ngāpuhi tribes pushed further east through the southern Bay of Islands to the open coast, absorbing tribes such as Ngāti Manu, Te Kapotai, Te Uri o Rata, Ngare Raumati, and Ngātiwai.

Hosting the first Christian mission 
Ruatara was chief of the Ngāpuhi from 1812 to his death in 1815. In 1814, he invited the Rev. Samuel Marsden to set up the first ever Christian mission in New Zealand on Ngāpuhi land. The presence of these influential Pakeha secured Ruatara's access to European plants, technology and knowledge, which he distributed to other Māori, thus increasing his mana. After the death of Ruatara, his uncle Hongi Hika became protector of the mission.

Thomas Kendall, John King, and William Hall, missionaries of the Church Missionary Society, founded the first mission station in Oihi Bay (a small cove in the north-east of Rangihoua Bay) in the Bay of Islands in 1814 and over the next decades established farms and schools in the area. In 1823 Rev. Henry Williams and his wife Marianne established a mission station at Paihia on land owned by Ana Hamu, the wife of Te Koki. In 1826, Henry's brother William and his wife Jane joined the CMS mission at Paihia. Marianne and Jane Williams established schools for the Ngāpuhi. William Williams lead the CMS missionaries in the translation of the Bible and other Christian literature; with the first chapters of the Māori Bible being printed at Paihia by William Colenso in 1827. The missionaries did not succeed in converting a single Māori until 1830 when Rawiri Taiwhanga (1818–1874), a Ngāpuhi chief, was baptised. Ruatara and Hongi Hika themselves welcomed the missionaries' presence, but did not convert. Hōne Heke attended the CMS mission school at Kerikeri and Heke and his wife Ono, were baptised in 1835.

Musket Wars

By the early 19th century, the Bay of Islands had become a prominent shipping port in New Zealand. Through increased trade with Europeans, initiated by Ruatara, Ngāpuhi gained greater access to European weapons, including muskets. Armed with European firearms, Ngāpuhi, led by Hongi Hika, launched a series of expansionist campaigns, with resounding slaughters across Northland and in the Waikato and Bay of Plenty.

United Tribes of New Zealand and the Declaration of Independence

On 28 October 1835, various Northland chiefs, primarily from the Ngāpuhi tribe, met at Waitangi with British resident James Busby and signed the Declaration of the Independence of New Zealand, proclaiming the United Tribes of New Zealand. In 1836, the Crown received and recognized the United Tribes' independence under King William IV. By 1839, 52 chiefs from around Northland and central North Island had signed the Declaration, including most Ngāpuhi chiefs and Pōtatau Te Wherowhero, ariki of the Tainui tribes of the Waikato (iwi).

Flagstaff War and re-erection of the flagstaff

In 1840, the Ngāpuhi chiefs were all signatories to the Treaty of Waitangi. However, from 1845 to 1846, Ngāpuhi fought against the British Crown over treaty disputes and European encroachment and interference. The Māori forces were led by Te Ruki Kawiti and Hōne Heke, who instigated the war when he chopped down the flagpole at Kororāreka to commence what is sometimes called the Flagstaff War. The British did not fight alone but had Ngāpuhi allies; Tāmati Wāka Nene had given the government assurances of the good behaviour of the Ngāpuhi and he felt that Hōne Heke had betrayed his trust in instigating the Flagstaff War.

The outcome of the Flagstaff War is a matter of some debate. Although the war was widely lauded as a British victory, it is clear that the outcome was somewhat more complex, even contentious. The flagstaff which had proved so controversial was not re-erected by the colonial government. Whilst the Bay of Islands and Hokianga was still nominally under British influence, the fact that the Government's flag was not re-erected was symbolically very significant. Such significance was not lost on Henry Williams, who, writing to E. G. Marsh on 28 May 1846, stating that "the flag-staff in the Bay is still prostrate, and the natives here rule. These are humiliating facts to the proud Englishman, many of whom thought they could govern by a mere name."

The legacy of Kawiti's rebellion during the Flagstaff War was that during the time of Governor Grey and Governor Thomas Gore Browne, the colonial administrators were obliged to take account of opinions of the Ngāpuhi before taking action in the Hokianga and Bay of Islands.

The Waitangi Tribunal in The Te Roroa Report 1992 (Wai 38) state that "[a]fter the war in the north, government policy was to place a buffer zone of European settlement between Ngāpuhi and Auckland. This matched Ngati Whatua's desire to have more settlers and townships, a greater abundance of trade goods and protection from Ngāpuhi, their traditional foe."

The flagstaff that now stands at Kororareka was erected in January 1858 at the direction of Kawiti's son Maihi Paraone Kawiti, as a signal to Governor Thomas Gore Browne, that Maihi did not follow his father's path. In a symbolic act, the 400 Ngāpuhi warriors involved in preparing and erecting the flagpole were selected from the "rebel" forces of Kawiti and Heke – that is, Ngāpuhi from the hapū of Tāmati Wāka Nene (who had fought as allies of the British forces during the Flagstaff War), observed, but did not participate in the erection of the fifth flagpole. The restoration of the flagpole was presented by Maihi Paraone Kawiti was a voluntary act on the part of the Ngāpuhi that had cut it down on 11 March 1845, and they would not allow any other to render any assistance in this work. The erection of the fifth flagstaff at Kororareka by the Ngāpuhi warriors who had conducted the Flagstaff War, and not by government decree, indicates the colonial government did not want to risk any further confrontation with the Ngāpuhi. The continuing symbolism of the fifth flagpole at Kororareka is that it exists because of the goodwill of the Ngāpuhi.

Notwithstanding the achievements of Te Ruki Kawiti and Hōne Heke in pushing back colonial government control over the Ngāpuhi, in the years after the Flagstaff War over 2,000 km2 of Ngāpuhi land was alienated from Māori control. As part of Maihi Paraone Kawiti's erection of the fifth flagpole at Kororareka, he offered the Governor all the lands between Karetu and Moerewa to north of Waiomio and as far south as the Ruapekapeka Pa. Tawai Kawiti described this offer of land as being "a whariki" (or mat) for the flag to repose on. The offer was accepted but was paid for at half the land's value.

20th and 21st centuries
Amidst cultural and economic decline, the twentieth century saw a steady migration of Ngāpuhi Māori from Northland into other regions of the North Island, mainly Auckland, Waikato and the Bay of Plenty. In part, this has seen the organisation of Ngāpuhi into large geographic and urban divisions.

The whārenui of Ōkorihi marae burned down in 2003.

Waitangi Tribunal - Te Paparahi o te Raki (Wai 1040)

In 2010, the Waitangi Tribunal began hearings into the Ngāpuhi's claim that sovereignty was not given up in their signing of the Treaty of Waitangi. The Tribunal, in Te Paparahi o te Raki inquiry (Wai 1040), considered the Māori and Crown understandings of He Whakaputanga o te Rangatiratanga / The Declaration of Independence 1835 and Te Tiriti o Waitangi / the Treaty of Waitangi 1840.

Many of the arguments used were outlined in Paul Moon's 2002 book Te Ara Ki Te Tiriti: The Path to the Treaty of Waitangi, which argued that not only did the Māori signatories have no intention of transferring sovereignty, but that at the time the British government and James Busby did not wish to acquire it and that the developments and justifications leading to the present state were later developments. A common Ngāpuhi interpretation of the Declaration of the United Tribes is that the British government was simply recognizing Māori independence and putting the world on check, merely re-asserting sovereignty that had existed from "time immemorial".

The Te Paparahi o Te Raki stage 1 inquiry hearings phase was intended to reach conclusions as to the meaning and effect of the treaty for the Crown and Te Raki Māori in 1840. Hearings began in May 2010 and on 14 November 2014, the Te Raki stage 1 report handover took place at Te Tii Marae, Waitangi.

The key conclusion of the stage 1 report was that the treaty signatories did not cede sovereignty in February 1840. "That is, they did not cede authority to make and enforce law over their people or their territories." The rangatira did, however, agree "to share power and authority with Britain".

The consequences of the findings in the stage 1 report were considered in the Te Raki stage 2 inquiry, with the Tribunal hearings considering issues including the immediate aftermath of the Treaty of Waitangi, the Flagstaff War and Crown pre-emption (the right of the Crown to acquire Māori land that is addressed in the treaty).

Hapū and marae

Media

Tautoko FM broadcasts to the people of Ngāpuhi-nui-tonu, and began operating on 28 November 1988. The Tautoko FM building burnt to the ground on 18 May 2015, cutting power to the small Mangamuka community.

Religion

Most Ngāpuhi, 49.6%, identify as being irreligious, according to data from Te Whata iwi estimates, based on 2018 Census data. 42.2% of Ngāpuhi specify a religious affiliation, larger than the 38.1% of Māori as a whole who specify religious affiliation.

Notable Ngāpuhi people

 Willie Apiata (born 1972), first recipient of the Victoria Cross for New Zealand
 Fred Baker (1908–1958), soldier and leader of the Māori Battalion
 Donna Campbell (born 1959), university teacher, curator, weaver, and textile artist
 Marama Davidson (born 1973), politician and co-leader of the Green Party
 Kelvin Davis (born 1967), politician and deputy leader of the Labour Party
 Abby Erceg (born 1989), soccer player
 Annabella Mary Geddes (1864–1955), welfare worker and community leader
 Sid Going (born 1943), rugby union player
 Ana Hamu (died 1848), woman of high rank and Treaty of Waitangi signatory
 Hōne Heke (1808–1850), chief
 Hongi Hika (–1828), chief
 Maewa Kaihau (1879–1941), composer, pianist and music teacher
 Te Ruki Kawiti (1770s–1854), chief
 Maihi Paraone Kawiti (1807–1889), chief
 Matt McCarten (born 1959), political organiser and trade unionist
 Anika Moa (born 1980), recording artist and television presenter
 Moetara (died 1838), chief, agriculturalist and trader
 Katerina Nēhua (1903–1948), endurance swimmer
 Pania Newton (born 1990 or 1991), lawyer and political activist
 Tāmati Wāka Nene (1780s–1871), chief
 Piripi Patiki (1813–1881), chief, teacher and missionary
 Eruera Maihi Patuone (c.1764–1872), chief
 Pokaia (died 1807), chief
 Pōmare I (died 1826), chief
 Pōmare II (died 1850), chief
 Diane Prince (born 1952), painter, weaver, installation art practitioner, and set designer
 Rachael Rakena (born 1969), artist
 Ruatara (–1815), chief
 David Seymour (born 1983), politician and leader of the ACT New Zealand party
 Rawiri Taiwhanga (1818–1874), chief, farmer, Anglican missionary, and teacher
 Aperahama Taonui (died 1882), chief, prophet, historian, teacher, and assessor
 Ihaia Te Ahu (–1895), teacher and missionary
 Parore Te Awha (died 1887), chief
 Moka Te Kainga-mataa (1790s–1860s), chief
 Samuel Te Kani (born 1990), author, artist, and sexpert
 Te Pahi (died 1810), chief and traveller
 Te Whareumu (died 1828), chief
 Tītore (–1837), chief

See also
 List of iwi
 Ngāti Hine, a subtribe

References

External links
 Te Runanga a Iwi o Ngāpuhi
 Taonui, Rāwiri. "Ngāpuhi". Te Ara Encyclopedia of New Zealand.

Ngāpuhi
Hokianga
Iwi and hapū